The W.L. Hill Store, built in 1913, is an historic three story department store located on York Street in the town of Sharon, York County, South Carolina. It is by far the largest building in town. Designed in the commercial style, by locally prominent architect Julian Starr, its size and grandeur was meant to mimic larger stores in major cities. On January 20, 1995, it was added to the National Register of Historic Places. It is located in the Hill Complex Historic District.

See also
National Register of Historic Places listings in York County, South Carolina

References

External links 

 Olde English District tourism information website
 South Carolina Department of Archives and History file on W.L. Hill Store

Commercial buildings on the National Register of Historic Places in South Carolina
Commercial buildings completed in 1913
Buildings and structures in York County, South Carolina
National Register of Historic Places in York County, South Carolina
1913 establishments in South Carolina
Historic district contributing properties in South Carolina
Chicago school architecture in the United States